Tarren Bragdon (born 1975) is an American former state legislator and think tank founder. At age 21, Bragdon won a seat in the Maine House of Representatives and became the youngest state legislator ever elected in Maine. A Republican, Bragdon served in the Maine House from 1996 through 2000. After two terms in office, Bragdon declined to seek re-election, instead taking a job running the Maine Heritage Policy Center (MHPC). Bragdon headed MHPC, a conservative think tank, from 2008 through 2011.

In 2010, Bragdon was appointed as co-chair of newly elected Maine Governor Paul LePage's transition team. In 2011, Bragdon left Maine and moved to Naples, Florida, to found the Foundation for Government Accountability (FGA), a free market think tank. Bragdon serves as the group's president and CEO.

References

External links

Republican Party members of the Maine House of Representatives
Husson University alumni
University of Maine alumni
People from Naples, Florida
Politicians from Bangor, Maine
1975 births
Living people